Stalnaker Hall, also known as Woman's Hall, is a historic dormitory building associated with the West Virginia University, located in Morgantown, Monongalia County, West Virginia. Constructed in 1918, it is a three-story, brick building on a high basement, with Classical Revival detailing. Two-story additions were built between 1935 and 1939.  The front facade features four Corinthian order columns that support a pediment with decorative concrete work.  It was named for Elizabeth Stalnaker, professor of philosophy and psychology in the early 20th century.

It was listed on the National Register of Historic Places in 1985.

References

See also
 National Register of Historic Places listings at colleges and universities in the United States

Residential buildings completed in 1918
Neoclassical architecture in West Virginia
Residential buildings on the National Register of Historic Places in West Virginia
West Virginia University campus
University and college buildings on the National Register of Historic Places in West Virginia
National Register of Historic Places in Monongalia County, West Virginia